Herforst is a municipality in the district of Bitburg-Prüm, in Rhineland-Palatinate, western Germany.

References

 Karl E. Becker: Speicher. Raum und Zeit. Paulinus, Trier 1981, S. 373–399.
 Heimat- und Kulturverein Herforst "Heerbischda Beschkläpa" (Hrsg.): Auf den Spuren der Langmauer. Östliches Teilstück. Weiler, Bitburg 2004.

External links
 Sites in Herforst

Bitburg-Prüm